Gannes is a commune in the Oise department in northern France. It is around 35 km south of Amiens and 80 km north of Paris.

It was the site of an air crash in the Second World War. In the early hours of 18 June 1944, Avro Lancaster HK559 of 115 Squadron RAF was shot down near the station on the eastern edge of Gannes, killing all seven crew, who were buried in the village cemetery. On 21 June 2009, just after the 65th anniversary of the event, a permanent memorial stone was unveiled near the site of the crash.

The rail station Gare de Gannes is located in Gannes.

See also
Communes of the Oise department

References
Loss of Lancaster HK559
Memorial stone

Communes of Oise